Admiral Bristol may refer to:

Augustus Hervey, 3rd Earl of Bristol (1724–1779), British admiral and politician
Arthur L. Bristol, Jr. (1886–1942), vice admiral in the U.S. Navy 
Mark Lambert Bristol (1868–1939), rear admiral in the U.S. Navy